Michael Solomon (born September 29, 1954 in Trinidad) is a retired athlete from Trinidad and Tobago who specialized in the 400 metres and 4 x 400 metres relay. He attended University of New Mexico, New Mexico, USA. His son, Jarrin Solomon, is also a 400 m sprinter.

Achievements

References

Best of Trinidad
sports-reference

1954 births
Living people
Trinidad and Tobago male sprinters
Athletes (track and field) at the 1976 Summer Olympics
Athletes (track and field) at the 1978 Commonwealth Games
Athletes (track and field) at the 1979 Pan American Games
Athletes (track and field) at the 1980 Summer Olympics
Olympic athletes of Trinidad and Tobago
Commonwealth Games competitors for Trinidad and Tobago
Pan American Games competitors for Trinidad and Tobago
Central American and Caribbean Games silver medalists for Trinidad and Tobago
Competitors at the 1978 Central American and Caribbean Games
Central American and Caribbean Games medalists in athletics
New Mexico Lobos men's track and field athletes